Codata, Co-data or CODATA may refer to:

 Committee on Data for Science and Technology, publishers of the CODATA recommended values of physical constants
 Coinductively defined data types in computer science
 CoData (company), a former computer hard disk start-up from Colorado, then merged in Conner Peripherals.

See also
 Data (disambiguation)